Fabrizio Sotti (born April 27, 1975, Padova, Italy) is a guitarist, composer, producer and songwriter. In addition to jazz, Sotti plays in the styles of bebop, jazz fusion, soul, hip hop, R&B and pop. He has worked with the likes of Al Foster, Randy Brecker, John Patitucci, Mino Cinelu, Roy Hargrove, Cassandra Wilson, Shaggy, Melanie Fiona, Jennifer Lopez, Ice-T, Tupac, Q-Tip, K'naan, M-1 (rapper), Dead Prez, Hell Razah, Jennifer Lopez, Zucchero, Mondo Marcio, Mina, Clementino among many others.

Equipment
Sotti endorses D'Angelico Guitars. His 2015 Fabrizio Sotti Signature Model, the EX-SS/FS, is based on the EX-SS with the addition of Seymour Duncan pick ups (SH2 and SH4), Sperzel machine heads, jumbo frets and reduced wood block for maximum resonance of the hollow body. In 2018 D'Angelico Guitars introduced the Fabrizio Sotti SS Deluxe Signature Model. In 2019 D'Angelico Guitars added the Fabrizio Sotti SS Premier Model.

Discography

As Leader
 Looking For 1993
 Standards and More, feat. Ares Tavolazzi and Mauro Beggio (1995)
 This World Upside Down (Eclipse/Warner Bros. 1999)
 Through My Eyes (Sotti Entertainment/Raitrade, 2004)
 Inner Dance (Sotti /E1, 2010)
 Right Now (Sotti Entertainment, 2013)
 A Few Possibilities (Sotti Entertainment/Incipit, 2014)
 Forty (Sotti Entertainment/Incipit, 2016)

As Producer, Guitarist and Songwriter
 Lathun, Fortunate (Universal/Motown, 2002)
 Cassandra Wilson, Glamoured (BlueNote, 2003)
 Kyrsten, So in Love (Sotti/Raitrade, 2003)
 Kyrsten feat. Foxy Brown, Move With Me (Sotti, 2003)
 Half Pint, Wha Ya wan (Sotti, 2004)
 Tupac, The Rose, Vol. 2 (Koch, 2005)
 Blue Note Plays Sting, (Blue Note, 2005)
 M1 of Dead Prez, Confidential (Sotti/Koch, 2006)
 Hell Razah, Renaissance Child (Nature Sounds, 2007)
 K'naan, The Dusty Foot Philosopher (BMG, 2008)
 Cassandra Wilson, Closer to You: The Pop Side (Blue Note, 2009)
 Cassandra Wilson, Another Country (E1, 2012)
 Tony Grey, Elevation (Abstract Logix, 2013)
 Alberto Pizzo, On the Way (Bixio/Egea, 2014)
 Francesco Lomagistro & Berardi Jazz Connection "A New Journey" (Jazz Engine 2014)
 Nicola Sorato & Giuseppe Sorato "Reset the World" (Sorato N&G 2014)
 Clementino "La Cosa Piu' Bella Che Ho" (Universal 2017)
 Mr.Paradise "Forastero" (Roc Nation 2017)
 Alessandra Salerno "Faith Within Your Hands" (Sotti Entertainment 2018)
 Mondo Marcio "Angeli e Demoni" featuring Mina (La Mondo Records/Sony 2019)
 Loris Al Raimondi "Delicate Passion" (2020)
 Mondo Marcio "Il Mio Riflesso" (La Mondo Records/Sony 2021)
 Pino Daniele Tribute Fabrizio Sotti, Omar Hakim, Rachel Z "Yes I Know My Way" featuring Frankie Hi-Nrg (Incipit Records 2021)
 Pino Daniele Tribute Fabrizio Sotti, Omar Hakim, Rachel Z "Quando" featuring Serena Brancale (Incipit Records 2021)
 Loris Al Raimondi "It's a Daughter" (2021)
 Pino Daniele Tribute Fabrizio Sotti, Omar Hakim, Rachel Z "O Scarrafone" featuring Paolo Fresu (Incipit Records 2022)

References

External links
 Interview at BBC
 Interview at Hodinkee
 Interview at International Watch
 Interview at Music Radar
 Review at JazzTimes
 Review at All About Jazz
 Review at Jazzdagama
 Interview at Ferrari.com
 

1975 births
Living people
Musicians from Padua
20th-century guitarists
20th-century Italian male musicians
21st-century guitarists
21st-century Italian male musicians
Italian jazz guitarists
Italian record producers
Italian songwriters
Male songwriters
Jazz composers
Italian male guitarists
Male jazz composers
Universal Music Group artists